Qarah Bolagh (also Romanized as Qarah Bolāgh and Qareh Bolāgh) is a village in Abbas-e Gharbi Rural District, Tekmeh Dash District, Bostanabad County, East Azerbaijan Province, Iran. At the 2006 census, its population was 163, in 38 families.

References 

Populated places in Bostanabad County